Colombia participated in the 2011 Parapan American Games.

Medalists

Athletics

Colombia will send eighteen male and seven female athletes to compete.

Boccia

Colombia will send two male and five female athletes to compete.

Cycling

Colombia will send fourteen male athletes to compete. Eight male athletes will compete in the road cycling tournament, while six male athletes will compete in the track cycling tournament.

Football 5-a-side

Colombia will send a team of eight athletes to compete.

Judo

Colombia will send three male athletes to compete.

Powerlifting

Colombia will send three male and one female athlete to compete.

Sitting volleyball

Colombia will send a team of twelve athletes to compete.

Swimming

Colombia will send ten male and four female swimmers to compete.

Table tennis

Colombia will send three male and one female table tennis player to compete.

Wheelchair basketball

Colombia will send a team of twelve male athletes to compete in the men's tournament.

Wheelchair tennis

Colombia will send two male and two female athletes to compete.

Nations at the 2011 Parapan American Games
2011 in Colombian sport
Colombia at the Pan American Games